Britta Lech-Hanssen (born Karin Anna Britta Ericsson; February 10, 1916 – February 22, 2007) was a Norwegian actress.

Career
Lech-Hanssen was engaged with the New Theater and then its successor, the Oslo New Theater, from 1947 to 1967. She also appeared in eight feature films between 1950 and 1970. She made her film debut in To mistenkelige personer.

Family
Lech-Hanssen was born in Narvik, Norway. She was the daughter of the ship captain Arnold Halfdan Ericsson (1886–1954) and Karoline Johanna Blix (1894–1922). She married the opera singer Gerhard Lech-Hanssen (1916–1968) in 1939. She was the mother of the actor Gerhard Arnold Lech-Hansen (1941–1995).

Filmography

1950: To mistenkelige personer as Anna
1953: Brudebuketten as the wife of the man traveling to Stockholm
1953: Den evige Eva as the maid
1955: Savnet siden mandag as Anna
1961: Et øye på hver finger as Mrs. Neslund
1961: Sønner av Norge
1964: Alle tiders kupp as Granlund's wife
1970: Døden i gatene

References

External links
 
 Britta Lech-Hanssen at Filmfront
 Britta Lech-Hanssen at Sceneweb

1916 births
2007 deaths
20th-century Norwegian actresses